Tomáš Vak (born 11 May 1978) is a Czech professional ice hockey player who currently plays with Yertis Pavlodar of the Kazakhstan Hockey Championship.

Vak previously played for HC Rebel Havlíčkův Brod, HC Pardubice, HC Ytong Brno, HC Vsetín, HC Energie Karlovy Vary and HC České Budějovice.

References

External links

Czech ice hockey right wingers
HC Bílí Tygři Liberec players
HC Dynamo Pardubice players
VHK Vsetín players
Motor České Budějovice players
HC Karlovy Vary players
Living people
1978 births
Yertis Pavlodar players
Sportspeople from Havlíčkův Brod
HC Kometa Brno players
Beibarys Atyrau players
Czech expatriate ice hockey people
Czech expatriate sportspeople in Kazakhstan
Expatriate ice hockey players in Kazakhstan